Rubén Ramos González (born 15 May 1993), commonly known as Rubén Gálvez, is a Spanish professional footballer who plays for Recreativo de Huelva as a goalkeeper.

Club career
Born in Aracena, Province of Huelva, Andalusia, Gálvez graduated from local Recreativo de Huelva's academy, and spent his first two years as a senior with their reserves. On 26 May 2013 he first appeared for the main squad, starting in a 2–1 home win against Córdoba CF in the Segunda División.

On 27 January 2014, Rubén signed a new two-year deal with Recre, being immediately loaned to Segunda División B club SD Huesca. He returned to the former in May, being definitely promoted to the first team.

References

External links

1993 births
Living people
Spanish footballers
Footballers from Andalusia
Association football goalkeepers
Segunda División players
Segunda División B players
Tercera División players
Atlético Onubense players
Recreativo de Huelva players
SD Huesca footballers
San Fernando CD players
UD Melilla footballers